This event was held on February 2, 2013 as a part of the 2013 UCI Cyclo-cross World Championships. Just like last year, Mathieu van der Poel of Netherlands took the gold, becoming the first person ever to win the junior's event twice.

Race report

Mathieu van der Poel went into the race as the big favourite, having won every single race he competed in during the 2012–2013 cyclo-cross season. This race wasn't different, he went full power from the very start and was safe from start to finish. A fall and a flat tire were not capable of taking it away from him. The race for the second spot was equally quickly decided with Martijn Budding, also from the Netherlands, having a nice lead on those behind him. There was more competition for the third spot, showing a nice battle between Belgians Yannick Peeters and Nicolas Cleppe, the Czech Adam Ťoupalík and the American Logan Owen. Peeters disappeared from that group after a fall, Owen shared the same faith. Cleppe had trouble following Ťoupalík, who took the bronze, and also got overtaken again by Owen who was giving it his all in hopes of reaching the podium.

Results

References

Men's junior race
UCI Cyclo-cross World Championships – Men's junior race
UCI Cyclo, Men's Junior